Claire de Gubernatis (born 18 July 1986) is a French professional tennis player.

As of 13 September 2010, she reached her highest singles rankings of 196. Her best doubles ranking was 233, which she achieved on 9 April 2007.

At the Morocco Open in Fes, she made her first appearance in the main draw of a WTA Tour tournament, reaching the second round as a qualifier where she fell to the eventual winner, Iveta Benešová.

ITF Circuit finals

Singles 11 (5–6)

Doubles: 11 (7–4)

External links
 
 

1986 births
Living people
French female tennis players